The Asian Banker is a company that provides information for the financial services industry in the form of publications, online materials such as e-newsletters, research, and conventions, and other industry gatherings. It is regarded as one of the Asian region's leading consultancies in financial services research, benchmarking and intelligence.

History
The Asian Banker was founded in Singapore in 1996 by Emmanuel Daniel, a former consultant. It was established first as a publisher of trade publication, such as The Asian Banker Journal, before moving into research, consulting, benchmarking, and events organisation, all catering to the financial services industry.

Publications
The company's original product was The Asian Banker Journal, a quarterly publication of 40 pages that was launched in January 1997.  Throughout 1997 and 1998, it provided on-the-ground coverage of the 1997 Asian financial crisis, anchored by Daniel's journalistic skills and award-winning articles—Daniel won the prestigious Citibank Excellence in Journalism Award for the Asian region in February 1999 for his work in determining the impact of the Internet on banking.

The magazine covers a wide range of industry topics, such as opinion editorials, current events analysis, retail banking, transaction banking, risk management, bank regulation and IT for financial services. It features profiles of individuals in the financial services industry, some of which can run to several pages if the individual is particularly influential. The publication is characterised by its coverage of bank CEOs and chief regulators interviews. The publications business also maintains a video interview website called The Banking Conversation. The website contains interviews, 10 to 30 minutes in length, of prominent figures in banking, economics, IT, investing and academia.

By 2005, The Asian Banker Journal was published 10 times a year. While Daniel has turned over management of the magazine to staff, he still writes for a blog.

Forums business
The company launched a forums division in 2000 to capitalise on the interest its readership had in taking part in a forum to discuss banking issues and challenges that had come to the fore in the aftermath of the 1997 Asian financial crisis. It held the first Asian Banker Summit in Singapore in 2000. Subsequent summits have been held in Kuala Lumpur, Bangkok, Jakarta and Hanoi, Beijing and Singapore.

The summit typically include fora on topics such as risk management, information technology, transaction banking, payment systems and regulation, and they include both opening, and closing, keynote speeches.

In The Asian Banker Summit 2008 in Hanoi and The Asian Banker Summit 2009 in Beijing, The Asian Banker collaborated with The Bankers' Association for Finance and Trade (BAFT) on a conference, held in conjunction with The Asian Banker Summit, called The BAFT Asia Conference on Cash, Treasury and Trade. On 27 October 2008, BAFT announced that it had renewed the agreement for the 2009 conference in Beijing.

Besides the Summit, the company holds events in other cities around Asia and organises The Asian Banker Awards Programme.

Research
The Asian Banker launched a research division in 2003. Asian Banker Research business compiles rankings, such as Asia Pacific banks by asset size and financial strength, CEO compensation, dividend payouts, the top 40 Islamic banking institutions in Asia, a databook of macro indicators of banking, payments and distribution, and industry performance. The division also writes management reports, research notes, country reports, and proprietary benchmarking on consumer banking technology and operations, and other topics.

The Asian Banker 300
While The Asian Banker's research business covers a variety of research projects, its most visible product is The Asian Banker 300, a reference guide to the 300 largest banks in Asia Pacific by assets. The company expands the list to over 500 banks in its online version. The research comes out in September or October and is launched every year at Sibos, the large annual financial services convention organised by SWIFT.

Since 2003, the guide has added a strength ranking, which measures each of the 300 banks according to a strength formula.  The formula weights assets, year-on-year growth in loans, year-on-year growth in deposits, and eight other criteria to arrive at a total strength score. Invariably, the largest banks are not necessarily the strongest banks, and in the 2009 financial year, the 10 strongest banks in the Asia Pacific region were HDFC Bank, Punjab National Bank, Public Bank, Bank of Nanjing, Bank Central Asia, China CITIC Bank, ANZ National Bank, Union Bank of India, Westpac and China Construction Bank.

References

External links 
Official Web Site
Radio Finance
The Asian Banker Awards Programmes

Financial services companies established in 1996
Financial services companies of Singapore
Banking industry
Business magazines
Magazines established in 1996
Professional and trade magazines
Magazines published in Singapore
Quarterly magazines
Chinese-language magazines
1996 establishments in Singapore